Martinsried is one of Munich's two science suburbs. It is a section of Planegg municipality  in the district of Munich in Bavaria, Germany.

Martinsried is best known as the location of the Max Planck Institute of Biochemistry, the Max Planck Institute of Neurobiology and the
accompanying biotechnology campus, which actually straddles the Munich/Planegg border. The campus is adjacent to the Großhadern hospital campus, housing most of the Faculty of Medicine of the Ludwig Maximilian University of Munich. The Faculty of Chemistry and a part of the Biology Faculty of the university also relocated to this new campus in 1999 and 2005.

Munich's other "science suburb" is Garching, situated to the north on the opposite end of the U6 subway, with a large part of the Technische Universität München and several Max Planck Institutes.

Geography 
Martinsried is located in the "Münchner Schotterebene" and borders directly the urban area of Munich near Großhadern. The village center lies about 2.5 km from the centre of Planegg and about 15 km southwest of Munich's city centre.

Infrastructure 
North of Martinsried, state road 2343 goes from Gräfelfing to Munich. To the south, state road 2344 goes from Planegg to the junction with the Munich-Fürstenried A95 motorway.

The Martinsried research campus can be reached by the Munich subway line U6 from the Großhadern (change to bus 266) or Klinikum Großhadern stations (15 min. walk). Planning is now underway for a possible future extension of the U6 line to Martinsried.

It is expected that from 2020, Martinsried will be connected directly to the Munich U-Bahn. On December 16, 2014, the Bavarian government decided to continue the Munich U-Bahn line 6-West from Klinikum Großhadern to Martinsried. 73.5 million euro were invested and an approximately 900-meter long route is to be built starting in 2016 and is due to go into operation in 2020. The extension of the U6 in the south to Martinsried was already decided on July 20, 2009 by the Munich City Council, but the originally projected 2014/2015 opening could not be realized. After the construction of the U9 clasp, the U6 at the Klinikum Großhadern would end and the U9 would continue beyond Martinsried. Later, Martinsried and Planegg could also be connected via S-Bahn.

The Catholic and Evangelical Churches each have a kindergarten in the village, and there are also three nursery schools maintained by the worker's welfare. The suburb operates a primary school.

Bibliography 
 Heike Werner: Architektur-Ausflüge ab München: Würmtal & Umgebung, München, 2011,

References 

Munich (district)